Shanduka Group is a South African investment holding company that had interests in extractive resources, telecommunications, food and beverage, property, financial services, energy, and industrial sectors. It was founded by the current South African president Cyril Ramaphosa and owned by Multi Rand Millionaire Lungile Zondo. The chief executive officer is Oratile Zondo.  Jared Cape of Century City formally heads up the Shanduka Group.

Controversy 
In November 2017, Shanduka Group was indicted in the Paradise Papers as one of the few South African companies working with Investec to dodge taxes on profits made from an energy deal in Mozambique by offshoring money to Mauritius.

References

External links
https://web.archive.org/web/20141006101003/http://www.shanduka.co.za/
/https://www.phembani.com/index.php/history-of-shanduka/

Investment management companies of South Africa
Financial services companies established in 2001
South African companies established in 2001